Intelligence and How to Get It: Why Schools and Cultures Count is a 2009 book about human intelligence by Richard Nisbett, a professor of social psychology at the University of Michigan. The book challenges the hereditarians' argument that IQ is entirely or almost entirely heritable, and argues that nonhereditary factors play a more significant role than hereditarians assert. It also recommends how to tutor children so as to maximize their intelligence. The book also argues that IQ scores are a valid, though imperfect, indicator of general intelligence, while criticizing some of the assertions made about such scores in the 1994 book The Bell Curve. The book's appendix argues that racial differences in IQ are entirely due to environmental factors.

Reviews
Writing for The New York Times, philosopher Jim Holt described the book as "a meticulous and eye-opening critique of hereditarianism." Psychologist Earl B. Hunt reviewed the book in the journal Intelligence, stating that "Nisbett is a very good writer, but he is a combative writer", and while "Nisbett is writing for a general audience" and "does so very well", Hunt argues that "Nisbett...goes too far in attacking discussions of the genetics of intelligence", that Nisbett's argument against the genetic origins of racial and ethnic differences was weakened by citing research on parenting practices without "[considering] the possibility that these practices may themselves be influenced by the parental genotype", and that Nisbett repeatedly attributed positions to unnamed "experts" without citation. Hunt concluded that "Presenting scientific findings, including controversies, to the general public is an honorable and important endeavor. In my opinion that goal is better served if the writer is specific about who said what, where, and is careful not to overstate his or her case." Another review of the book published in Personality and Individual Differences by psychologist James J. Lee concluded that "Nisbett's arguments are consistently overstated or unsound" with regard to the heritability and mutability of IQ and racial differences in IQ. In Gifted Child Quarterly, Wendy Johnson described the book as "a fascinating example of a scholarly exercise in wishful thinking", and criticized Nisbett for ignoring studies with results different from those that he cites, disregarding the importance of replication, and forgetting the limitations and caveats raised by the authors that he cites.

References

2009 non-fiction books
Books about human intelligence
Books about The Bell Curve
Books by Richard E. Nisbett
Race and intelligence controversy
W. W. Norton & Company books